
Thomas Malton (1748 – 7 March 1804; also known as Thomas Malton the Younger), was an English painter of topographical and architectural views, and an engraver. J. M. W. Turner and Thomas Girtin were amongst his pupils. He is designated "the younger" to differentiate him from his father Thomas Malton, the Elder.

Life and work

Malton was born in London, the son of Thomas Malton the Elder (1726–1801), a notable architectural draughtsman and writer on geometry. He was with his father during the latter's residence in Dublin, and then passed three years in the office of James Gandon the architect, in London. In 1774 Malton received a premium from the Society of Arts. He entered the Royal Academy and in 1782 gained a gold medal for his design for a theatre. In 1773 he sent the Academy a view of Covent Garden, and was afterwards a constant exhibitor, chiefly of views of London streets and buildings, drawn in Indian ink and tinted. In these there is little attempt at pictorial effect, but their extreme accuracy in the architectural details renders them of great interest and value as topographical records. They are enlivened with groups of figures, in which Malton is said to have been assisted by Francis Wheatley.

After leaving Ireland, Malton appears to have always lived in London – with the exception of a brief stay at Bath in 1780. From 1783 to 1789 he resided in Conduit Street in London where at an evening drawing class which he held there, he received as pupils, Thomas Girtin and a young J M W Turner, whose father brought him to be taught on perspective. Turner paid tribute to him in later life by saying "my real master was Tom Malton".
In 1791 Malton moved to Great Titchfield Street, and finally, in 1796, to Long Acre. He made a few of the drawings for William Watts's Seats of the Nobility and Gentry published in 1779, and executed some large aquatints of buildings in both London and Bath, being one of the first to avail himself of the newly introduced art of aquatinta for the purpose of multiplying copies of his views. He also painted some scenes for the Covent Garden Theatre.In 1792 Malton published the work by which he is now best known, 'A Picturesque Tour through the Cities of London and Westminster', illustrated with a hundred aquatint plates. Between 1798–1800 he produced Views from Cambridge, and at the time of his death was engaged upon a similar series of views of Oxford, some of which appeared in parts in 1802, and were reissued with others in 1810.

Thomas Malton the Younger, himself, was painted by American artist Gilbert Stuart.

Malton died in Long Acre, London, on 7 March 1804, leaving a widow and six children.

Family 
A portrait of his son Charles as a child was drawn and water-coloured by Sir Thomas Lawrence; it was engraved by F C Lewis. The water colour was recently sold by Christie's. One other version was in the British Museum. Charles (born 1788) was an apprentice of and worked with Sir John Soane on the architectural drawings of the Bank of England. Details in the Sir John Soane Museum show an apology letter from Charles for talking to Soane's servants. After qualifying from study, Charles married an heiress and seems never to have practiced as an architect.

Thomas Malton the Younger's brother James Malton (1761–1803) was also a notable artist, draughtsman and engraver in Ireland and London.

Works
Works by Malton can be found in the UK Government art collection and the Victoria and Albert Museum in London; the Victoria Art Gallery in Bath, Somerset and the State Hermitage Museum in Saint Petersburg, Russia.

References

External links

Works by Thomas Malton (Artnet)
Thomas Malton Aquatints (Heatons)
Works by Thmas malton (Government Art Collection)
The Arsenal Cannon Foundery in the Litanie, St. Petersburg (1790 aquatint)
The Banqueting House and the Privy Garden, Whitehall, London (1796 watercolour)
Old Palace yard, Westminster (Colour aquatint – exhibited 1796)
New palace yard, Westminster (Colour aquatint)
Westminster Bridge (Monochrome aquatint)
Staircase to The Hall of Christ Church, Oxford (1802 aquatint engraving)
Government art collection
State Hermitage Museum

18th-century English painters
English male painters
19th-century English painters
English watercolourists
English landscape painters
1748 births
1804 deaths
19th-century English male artists
18th-century English male artists